The 2021–22 season was 1. FC Union Berlin's 57th season in existence and the club's 3rd consecutive season in the Bundesliga, the top tier of German football. The club participated in the DFB-Pokal and the UEFA Europa Conference League.

Players

Squad

Out on loan

Background

Having finished the 2019–20 season, their first in the Bundesliga, in 11th-place, Union started the 2020–21 season strongly and were in fifth-place and one point behind third-place after 16 matches. Union picked up just seven points from their next 8 matches before a return to fitness for Max Kruse saw an upturn in the club's form as they secured a seventh-placed finish and qualification to the 2021–22 UEFA Europa Conference League after Kruse scored a stoppage time winner in a final day victory over RB Leipzig.

Friendly matches

Competitions

Bundesliga

League table

Results summary

Results by matchday

Matches
The league fixtures were announced on 25 June.

DFB-Pokal

Europa Conference League

Group stage

Transfers

In

Out

Statistics

Appearances and goals

|-
! colspan=14 style=background:#dcdcdc; text-align:center| Goalkeepers

|-
! colspan=14 style=background:#dcdcdc; text-align:center| Defenders

|-
! colspan=14 style=background:#dcdcdc; text-align:center| Midfielders

|-
! colspan=14 style=background:#dcdcdc; text-align:center| Forwards

|-
! colspan=14 style=background:#dcdcdc; text-align:center| Players transferred out during the season

|-

Goalscorers

Notes

References

Union Berlin
1. FC Union Berlin seasons
2021–22 UEFA Europa Conference League participants seasons